Dr. Raymond Carson "Ray" Palmer, also known by his superhero alias The Atom, is a fictional character and a superhero in The CW's Arrowverse franchise of TV series, first appearing in the 2014 episode "The Calm", of the television series Arrow, based on the character of the same name, created by Gardner Fox, Gil Kane and Murphy Anderson, and adapted for television by Greg Berlanti, Marc Guggenheim and Andrew Kreisberg. The character has been portrayed by Brandon Routh in all shows.

This version of The Atom has also appeared in live-action series such as The Flash, Legends of Tomorrow, Supergirl and Batwoman and the web animated series Vixen. He is one of the many characters who jumped to from other Arrowverse shows, to Legends of Tomorrow. In the show Arrow, he worked with Oliver Queen and later was recruited by Rip Hunter to save the timeline. In season 5 of the Legends of Tomorrow, the character decided to leave the team, to live a normal life with his wife Nora Darhk.

Concept and creation 

The Atom debuted in Showcase No. 34, of 1961, from the DC Comics precursor, National Comics. The idea was to present to the readers an updated version of Al Pratt, the company's 1940s Golden Age Atom. His alter ego, Ray Palmer, is an homage to science-fiction magazine editor Raymond A. Palmer. The character was created by Gardner Fox (as the writer), Gil Kane (as the artist) and Murphy Anderson (as the inker). He was the second character to take the mantle, after Al Pratt. Palmer has appeared in plenty of animated TV series, such as in The Superman/Aquaman Hour of Adventure, having his own special episode, The All-New Super Friends Hour, Super Friends, DC Animated Universe, Batman: The Brave and the Bold, Young Justice, DC Nation Short, Justice League Action and Teen Titans Go, voiced by Pat Harrington, Jr., Wally Burr, John C. McGinley, Peter Scolari, Jason Marsden and Jerry O'Connell.(ref.) He first appeared in live-action in the 1979 episode "The Roast", of the show Legends of the Superheroes, played by Alfie Wise. He later appeared in the 1997 live action TV series pilot, Justice League of America played by John Kassir.

Brandon Routh, as Ray Palmer, made his Arrowverse debut in season three of the anchor show, Arrow in 2014, as a recurring character. Stephen Amell, the protagonist of Arrow, shared, on his Facebook account, his excitement for Brandon being cast in the show. The character then appeared in recurring capacity in season four, and guest starring in season one of The Flash. He would later join the spin-off series Legends of Tomorrow as part of the main cast. Brandon had previously portrayed Clark Kent / Superman, in the Superman Returns movie. The actor left the character in season 5 of the Legends of Tomorrow, although he made two last guest star appearances in season 8 of The Flash, and in season 7 of the Legends one hundred episode.

Characterization 
On July 7, 2014, Brandon Routh was cast as Atom. He was described as "an unparalleled scientist, and inventor, with a go-getter aspect" who would shake Oliver Queen's world. Marc Guggenheim said that he would be a "sloppy" superhero. Marc also had stated that he was excited for Brandon, and the casting was "beyond cool". The actor had said that Ray would come "in the middle" of Oliver's and Felicity's relationship, but with no bad intentions, and was hesitant to accept the role. When Routh was asked, in 2015, how does it feel to play another superhero, rather than Superman, he said "It’s cool. I was a little wary at first. I never really thought that I’d play another hero in the DC world having played kind of the pinnacle of them all. But it’s been a lot of fun bringing Ray to life. The suit is pretty awesome and very different than Superman’s suit, so I’m excited [...]". He added that he had never read any Atom comic book, and was fascinated by the "Sword of the Atom" one, that ran in the 1980s. When asked about if his Atom character has put Superman in the rear-view mirror, he said "I don’t know if I’ve put Superman in the rear- view mirror, but to have something else that people know me for is cool". Greg Berlanti, the co-creator of the Legends of Tomorrow, had stated that the show was supposed to be an Atom-centered spin-off series, with Routh starring in it, because they saw the charisma Routh had brought to the character. Routh has said that his character had anxiety while working with the Legends, and personal issues about his harsh childhood, that were challenging for him, but also interesting to add more depth to the character. When asked, in the same interview, about his love life in across the shows, he responded by saying that Ray never stops believing in love, and always open for it. Routh, when questioned about why the Atom is not shown in his micro-form, he said that it costs money, and the Legends has many central characters, with their own powers. His micro-from is kept for special occasions. When Routh was asked about how his friendship with his fellow co-star Nick Zano's character had impacted his character, he said that it enriched it, while adding that his character has good relations with everyone on the show. The actor has stated that his wife, actress Courtney Ford, who played along with him in as Nora Darhk, helped him through the tough times of his career, and during his time as the Atom. He, also, revealed that when he announced to his co-starts of the Legends show that he would leave it "[...] nobody, to my knowledge, in the crew wanted to see me go." He said that it was a very traumatic experience when he left the Legends. Routh returned as Ray for the one hundred episode of the Legends of Tomorrow, and said he did it because when he exited the show, it was a bad decision, while adding as a reason the need to show a more mature version of the character. He said that it was easier to return for The Flash, rather than the Legends of Tomorrow. Routh returned to the character again for The Flash's episode The Man in the Yellow Tie.

Fictional character biography

Early life 
Ray was born in 1981 to David and Sandy Palmer in Ivy Town and had a twin brother, Sydney. Ray had a lonely childhood, and was inspired to become an engineer and inventor after watching Star Wars as a child. In 1988, Ray had come across a time-displaced alien baby Dominator. He befriended the alien, but soon, the situation drew the attention of the NSA, that killed him, but thanks to the Legends of Tomorrow intervention, they fixed the timeline and saved Ray. During his university years, Ray was a student of Professor Martin Stein, and was top of his class. Sometime prior to the spring of 2014, Ray became engaged to Anna Loring. While in Starling City, both were caught in the crossfire of Slade Wilson's siege on the city, resulting to the death of his fiancé. He then promised to avenge her death, by finding a way to save his city from ever having to face a similar danger again.

Becoming The Atom 

In late 2014, he met Felicity Smoak and became interested in her. Sometime later, he went to the Queen Consolidated, and met with its CEO, Oliver Queen, about purchasing the company. After a meeting, he became its CEO, and began rebranding it, by the name "Palmer Technologies", with a goal of providing free energy to the city. He also bought Tech Village stores, were Felicity worked, proposing to her to work for him, an offer she declined. At some point, he held an event to announce that he would give half of his net-worth to the benefit of Starling City to become Star City. The event was crushed by Simon Lacroix / Komodo, but the Arrow saved them. In the same day, Felicity accepted his job offer, placing her as his new Vice President of Palmer Technologies. During this time, he used the Technologies' information and science to design the A.T.O.M. Exosuit. One day, he found a crying Felicity in her office, kissing her, but felt confused and left. Later on, Ray wanted to clear the picture, but Felicity said to him to forget about it, as it never happened. On December 19, 2014, he was attacked by a time travelling assassin called The Pilgrim, but was saved by Rip Hunter and Firestorm. The two took him to the Waverider, where they removed his memories of the event. Afterwards, he met with Felicity, and asked her about the progress of the exoskeleton's chip, but she said that the ATOM wouldn't bring back Anna, angering him. During an emergency meeting with the Mayor, a gang attacked the building, and Ray managed to save Felicity and himself. After some time, he and Felicity went on a date, and officially began dating, and he completed the suit. At John Diggle and Lyla Michaels's wedding, Felicity brought him as her companion. Ray ended up officiating their marriage when the priest couldn't make it, as he was a licensed minister. When the Arrow appeared to go on a murdering spree, Ray voiced his support to apprehend the vigilante. One night while flying, he saw him standing over murdered bodies in a warehouse and used his facial recognition to discover that the Arrow is Oliver Queen. After revealing to Felicity the suit's completion and his knowledge on Oliver, Felicity tried telling him that Oliver's being framed, but he didn't trust her. Ray went to the city's Assistant District Attorney, Laurel Lance, but she didn't help him, also giving up her secret identity. He faked a 911 call to attract Arrow and Roy Harper / Arsenal, in a rooftop. There, they fought, with Ray, wearing his suit, coming defeated. After their fight, Ray called Mayor Celia Castle and Police Captain Quentin Lance to inform them that Arrow is not a threat, and then an Arrow-impersonator attacked them, killing the Mayor. Ray saved Felicity from being shot, but is shot himself. He is rushed to the hospital, where he used his nano-tech to save himself.

To improve the A.T.O.M. exosuit, Ray and Felicity travelled to Central City, to seek assistance from S.T.A.R. Labs and Barry Allen / The Flash. As Team Flash helps him improve the suit, Ray developed a friendly rapport with Cisco Ramon. That same day's night, he and Felicity called Iris West and her boyfriend Eddie Thawne on a double date. The night quickly turned disastrous due to Iris' frustration with Eddie's secret, that of knowing Barry's secret identity. On the next day, a metahuman named Brie Larvan, attacked Tina McGee, with the heroes saving her.

Back in Starling City, his dating with Felicity didn't progress, while he also joined Team Arrow, with Oliver asking his help, to capture a metahuman, named Jake Simmons. Ray couldn't stop the villain, and was criticized by Oliver for not taking things seriously. They eventually defeated him, and Ray met with Cisco to talk about the metahuman, discovering that he wasn't in Central City during the particle accelerator explosion, thus he obtained his powers differently. During the League of Assassins bio-terrorism attack to Starling City, he and Felicity were able to contain the virus. The next day, Ray implanted his nano-tech into his suit, which would allow it to miniaturize selected targets and reduce the scale of the suit itself. This caused this office to explode, leaving Ray to be presumed dead. However, he survived the explosion, though shrunken to the size of an atom. Despite this, Starling City was renamed as Star City in honor of his heroism and vision.

Captured by H.I.V.E. 

Six months later, Felicity was able to contact Ray and revealed that he had been captured, by Damien Darhk. Darhk wanted to use the ATOM suit. He threatened Felicity to make the suit usable, but they were saved by Team Arrow. He placed Felicity as CEO of Palmer Technologies, and waited for the right time to reveal he was alive. Felicity later asked for his assistance in studying the DNA of a H.I.V.E. assassin, to track the base of operations of the terrorist group. Ray revealed to her that he wasn't revealing himself as alive, because he felt ashamed of how little his life had achieved when the world believed him dead. The two of them eventually tracked the base, and captured John Diggle's brother, Andy.

Aiding Vixen 

When Mari McCabe / Vixen and her sister Kuasa broke into a collector's home in Star City to retrieve the Water Totem of Zambesi to defeat General Benatu Eshu, Kuasa attempted to steal the Totem for herself, only to be stopped by Ray and Laurel Lance / Black Canary, who were informed by Mari for her sister's action. The four of them went to Detroit to defeat Eshu, and succeeded.

Working with the Legends

Stopping Vandal Savage's plan 

In January 2016, Ray helped Oliver with a mission to stop several H.I.V.E. assassins. After defeating them, he was intercepted by Rip Hunter. The former Time Master presented a proposal to form a team to take down Vandal Savage, a future dictator and immortal before he could rise to power. Oliver advised him to join the team. The other members were Sara Lance / White Canary, Carter Hall / Hawkman, Kendra Saunders / Hawkgirl, Leonard Snart / Captain Cold, Mick Rory / Heat Wave, Martin Stein and Jefferson Jackson. He and the others arrived at their timeship, the Waverider, which took them to the year 1975, in St. Roch, Louisiana. There, they met and retrieved from Dr. Aldus Boardman information about Savage. During their way back to the ship, they were attacked by a time travelling mercenary, called Chronos, and were able to escape. Rip revealed to them that Savage killed his family and that's why he seeks to stop him, something that angered Ray, but decided to stay on the team. Next, the team headed to Norway, where Savage was holding a black-market auction of a Nuclear Bomb. The team fights Savage's men, and defeated them, but failed to capture Savage, with Ray leaving a piece of his suit behind, changing history. The team then headed to retrieve a device to locate the piece, created by a young Martin Stein, in 1975. Ray, Leonard and Mick went to steal the Amon Dagger, the only weapon that can kill the two Thanagarians. However, they were captured by Savage. The team managed to save them, but Savage killed Carter. Ray later helped remove some pieces of the dagger from Kendra's organism. The Legends later went to the Pentagon, in 1986, to steal a file that would tell them Savage's whereabouts. They succeeded, and found he was in the Soviet Union, trying to create his own Firestorm, using the ATOM's technology. They succeeded on stopping him, but Waverider was attacked by Chronos, throwing them in another universe, in the year 2046. There, they met with John Diggle, Jr / Connor Hawke / Green Arrow and helped him defeat Grant Wilson / Deathstroke. Following their victory, he asked Kendra out, but she refused.

Sometime later, the Waverider was attacked by time pirates. As the ship was damaged, Ray went to fix it, and while doing it, he had cardiac arrest, but Kendra performed CPR and revived him. The pirates, with the assistance of Mick, almost won, but the team defeated them, and placed Mick in a containment cell. Kendra kissed Ray, revealing her feelings for him. With the team reorganized, they went to Harmony Falls, Oregon, of 1958, were Savage was living, going by the alias of "Gail", who didn't recognize Kendra. Ray and she acted like married, and the two stole the Dagger. As Savage and his people turned monsters were attacking the team, they were able to push them back, and cure the people, but Savage escaped. As they were about to leave with the Waverider, Chronos attacked, forcing it to depart, without him, Kendra and Sara. Because of damage to the ship, they were stuck in the past for two years, with Ray becoming a college professor, instructing students such as Bill Gates Sr. Ray and Kendra came closer and became a couple, while working on a time beacon to attract the attention of the ship. As he was about to propose with an engagement ring, the ship arrived, and saved them. Kendra was overjoyed to be rescued and was eager to resume her old life, but Ray was hurt by what he perceived as a disregard of everything they had built together. He reluctantly gathered some of their belongings from their home and rejoined the team. The team went and picked up Sara, who had joined the League of Assassins, under Ra's al Ghul. There, Chronos attacked, but was defeated and captured, revealing to be Mick Rory. The team later went to the year 2147, in the country of Kasnia, in an effort of stopping Savage from rising to power. In the future, Ray found his suit display, and a woman he believed was a descended of his, Dr. Bryce, but it was actually his brother's. The team failed on their mission, and attracted the attention of the Time Masters, and had sent their assassins after them. They went to hide in the year of 1871, in the town Salvation, in the Old West, where they met with Jonah Hex. Hex revealed to them that he knew of the existence of time travellers, and asked for help to defeat a gang that was terrorising the city. The team at first didn't agree, with Ray being the sole one to take action, but as they show his bravery they joined him, and stopped them. But, the assassins arrived, and the two sides fought, with the Legends coming victorious. With the assassins defeated, the Time Masters ordered The Pilgrim, an elite hunter, to initiate Omega Protocol, which was a process in which she would kill a past version of the offender, thus erasing them from existence. After Ray was wounded, he proposed to Kendra, and she accepted. Eventually, the team managed to defeat the Pilgrim.

Rip decided to take the team to the year 2166, during the reign of Savage, to stop him from killing his family. There, they were attacked by a giant robot, Leviathan, with Ray becoming as tall as the robot, destroying it. Ray discovered that the robot's technology was from the future, Rip wanted to take Savage to the Time Masters, for illegal time travel. The Waverider took them to the Vanishing Point, the headquarters of the Masters. In the Point, they found out that the Time Masters were aiding Savage, while also revealing that they didn't have free will. The team schemed, and were able to destroy the Vanishing Point, with Leonard sacrificing himself, gaining their free will back. After the event, Rip returned the members of the team in 2016, five months after he recruited them. Ray didn't like fact that they never finished their mission, and went to Mick, who he convinced to finish it. With the help of Martin, they created a time beacon, and summoned the Waverider. Then, they went to Saint-Lô, France, in 1944, and rescued Kendra. Afterwards, they went to 1958, and killed the past-Savage, and then in 2021 to kill future-Savage, stopping him and his plan for good. As they were about to leave with the Waverider, a future Waverider appeared, with Rex Tyler warning them not to leave.

Defeating the Legion of Doom 

Ray and the team had numerous missions, such as protecting the King of France Louis XIII, in 1637. During a mission in New York City of 1942, they tried stopped a nuclear bomb from being thrown by a Nazi submarine to destroy the city, a plan made by Damien Darhk. As the nuke was thrown, Rip putted the Waverider in front of it, and activated a last-ditch measure called the "Time Scatter", sending every member of the team in a random time period. Ray was sent back in time to 70 million BC. He spent six months, until he was rescued by Nate Heywood and Mick Rory / Heat Wave. After all of the Legends were back on the Waverider, they returned to 1942, to investigate, but were confronted by the Justice Society of America. The JSA easily defeated the Legends and had them locked up at their headquarters. Shortly after they let them go, but Nate discovered that the JSA was going to die on their next mission. The Legends stopped the Nazis from killing the JSA, and left 1942. At some point, Amaya Jiwe / Vixen attacked the team, wanting to kill Mick for believing he killed Rex Tyler, but stopped her. Sara asked Ray to train Nate, as he had developed superpowers. As they were training, the opened a hole in the ship, and ended up in Feudal Japan. Ray lost his ATOM suit and was taken by Shogun Tokugawa Iemitsu. Eventually, he had to destroy the suit, and was saved by the team. When the Legends received a call from a time traveler that crashed in the 1860s during the American Civil War, were a zombie virus was spreading. Ray and Martin developed a cure, saving the day. When Gideon informed the team of an aberration in 1987, at the White House, they went and found Darhk. Security arrived and Ray used Leonard Snart's cold gun to fight them off. The team left, but when a younger version of Martin was stabbed, they rushed him to the Waverider, saving him. Ray and the team found out that Darhk wanted to kill the President and the Soviet delegation, triggering a war, using a bomb. Ray froze the bomb with his gun, and the Legends left victorious. Then the team travelled to the Old West, to stop another aberration. Working with Jonah Hex, they fixed it, and Ray took some dwarf star alloy, and remade his ATOM suit.

At some point, Barry called the team to help with the threat of an invasion by the Dominators. Ray and the Legends joined a team of heroes, such as Team Flash, Team Arrow and Kara Danvers / Supergirl from Earth-38. When Barry revealed to the heroes that he changed the timeline, Ray was among the ones who were angry at him, but forgave him. When he was captured by the aliens, he was placed in a fantasy reality, where he was friends with the Queen family, and was invited to Oliver's wedding to Laurel, when he bumped into Sara and seemed to spark some memories of being teammates aboard the Waverider. Eventually, they escaped and joined the other heroes, and defeated the Dominators.

Afterwards, Waverider detected an aberration in 1927, Chicago, where Al Capone was working with Darhk and Malcolm Merlyn. Sara and Martin were captured by them, but Ray was able to save them. They returned to the Waverider, but it was revealed that Martin was Eobard Thawne / Reverse Flash in disguise, who stole a part of a medallion, able to locate the Spear of Destiny. When they found signs that the Legion was in 1967 Los Angeles, they went off and found Rip Hunter who was going by the name Phil and was working as a filmmaker. When the Legion attacked, they kidnapped Rip, in order of extracting information about the Spear. Gideon alerted the team that George Washington was killed before he could cross Delaware, in 1776. The team went before the assassination preventing it, and found a brainwashed Rip working for the Legion, but escaped. Gideon, using an algorithm to locate a piece of the Spear, found it in the year 3000. However, when the team arrived, the spear had already been stolen by Rip, and had murdered Doctor Mid-Nite. Shortly afterwards, Gideon located another spear fragment in 507 A.D., Britain. There, Ray met with King Arthur, and Courtney Whitmore / Stargirl / Merlin. There, Darhk was after the piece, and Ray fought him in a sword dual, and beat him, while also capturing Rip, reforming him afterwards. Rip told them that the last piece was on April 11, 1970. The Legends travelled there, and met with Nate's father, Henry Heywood, who revealed to them that the piece was part of Neil Armstrong's Moon flag. When the Apollo 13 spacecraft had some issues, Ray went to the ship, and found out that Thawne had hijacked it, to land on the Moon and take the piece. Ray fought him, and overpowered him. When the spacecraft landed on the Moon, he took the piece and left. Ray took Thawne in the Waverider, where they locked him in a cell, but managed to escape. Rip told the team that the Legion was operating in the Vanishing Point, and the team successfully obtained the last piece of the Spear. In the Waverider, the pieces formed the Spear, and the team had to destroy it. They went in 1916, during the first World War, in France, to find J. R. R. Tolkien, who knew where the blood of Christ was kept, the only thing in the world that could destroy the Spear. Unfortunately, Mick betrayed them, and joined Thawne, who took the Spear and created a new reality. In the new reality, Ray was made into a janitor at Thawne owned S.T.A.R. Labs and had no memory of his past life. One day, he was found by Nate and a reformed Mick, who gave him back his memories. Ray and the others found the last remaining Legends, and attacked the Legion, but failed to take the Spear. The defeated team, decided to go back in time, to the moment they lost the Spear to stop Thawne. They went to 1916, where Thawne followed them, killing Ray. The Legends managed to take the Spear, and deactivate it, making it useless. Thawne was killed by a speedster-hunter, Hunter Zolomon / Black Flash, erasing Ray's death from ever happening. The team sent Merlyn and Darhk back to the moment they were taken, deleting their memories of the events. After that, they decided to go to Aruba to celebrate, but they crush landed in Los Angeles of the present, where dinosaurs attacked them.

Defeating Mallus 

As the Legends tried to figure out how to fix the now disheveled timeline, the Time Bureau intervened and saved the timeline. The Time Bureau was headed by Rip Hunter, who created it in 2012, with the purpose of fixing anachronisms without the extra damage the team was causing. Rip took the Waverider, and forced the team to retire. Ray decided to settle down in Silicon Valley, revealing to the public that he was alive. started working for Upswiped a tech company. He was unhappy seeing he got demoted in life itself. Sometime later, the team reassembled, in order of taking Julius Caesar back to his time, stealing and using the ship. After capturing Caesar, they sent him back to his time, but he managed to steal Roman history book, conquering the world. The Time Bureau arrived before the Legends could act, but failed, and allowed the Ray and the team to handle it. The team were successful on fixing history, and allowed them to continue their operations. The team fixed numerous anachronisms, such as in 1870 Wisconsin, 2044 Seattle, and 1988 Ivy Town. In one mission, in London of 1895, they found a cult, with the goal of resurrecting Damien Darhk, headed by his daughter, Nora. Afterwards, they went fix other anachronisms in 1937, Hollywood, and in 1967, Vietnam, caused by Darhk.

Ray was contacted by Felicity, who sent a message to help them with a Nazi invasion from Earth-X. Ray and other heroes infiltrated an occupied S.T.A.R. Labs, and saved Kara and Felicity from Thawne. During the crisis, Martin was killed, something that broke him. He and the other heroes faced the Nazis and managed to defeat them. After the battle, Ray and the heroes attended Martin's funeral.

After that, they went to fix an anachronism in North America, of 1000. There, they found Dahrk and his daughter, and defeated them. At one point, John Constantine joined the team, to help the a possessed by Mallus, Nora, but Darhk stopped them. Ray then found that Sara was possessed by Mallus, and John managed to perform an exorcism. They found out that Mallus wanted to take all mystical Totems, to dominate the world, and Darhk was helping him, who had already taken the Fire Totem. Ray and the team first went to The Bahamas of 1717, where Blackbeard had the Earth Totem. Then, the Darhks appeared, with Nora becoming ill when she touched the Totem. The team left with the Earth Totem, but lost the Spirit one. Ray felt that Nora would die, and went back in time, before their battle and to save her, but was knocked out by Nora, and kidnapped him, although he managed to inform the team. Ray was forced to have to repair the Fire Totem, but to do so they went to 1962 in West Berlin, to achieve cold fusion. When they found the scientist who created it, a past version of Darhk appeared, trying to kill the scientist, but they escaped. Ray managed to escape, and was saved by Wally West / Kid Flash, stealing the Fire Totem. The team then went to Memphis of 1954 to fix an anachronism, finding the Death Totem. Then, Rip alerted the team that Gorilla Grodd, sent by Darhk, was going to kill Barack Obama in 1979. Ray and the team encountered Darhk, who asked them for help saving Nora from Mallus. Darhk gave them the Water Totem. The team and Darhk arrived in Zambesi Village of 1998, where the team used the Totems, combining their powers into a giant Beebo, defeating Mallus in his true form, with Rip and Darhk sacrificing themselves. After the battle, John told them that a new danger was looming, that were released from Mallus's realm throughout time.

Defeating Neron 

During the next days, Ray and the team hunted magical fugitives, in Woodstock festival of 1969, Salem of 1692, and Maine of 1990. At one point, his good friend Nate / Steel left to work for the Time Bureau. After that, Ray continued his work with the remaining Legends, forming a bond with Charlie. Afterwards, he finally decided to search for Nora. He found her in 2018, and brought her to the Waverider, to help save a magic wounded John, because she herself had magic powers. She refused, but Ray convinced her. Nora saved John, and thanked him for seeing the best in her. Ray gave her the Time Stone to escape the team, but she instead went to the Time Bureau, and gave herself in. After the event, they went in Paris of 1920, where Ray and Nora revealed their feelings for each other. The team fought magical fugitives in 1856, Mexico City of 1961, and Washington, D.C. of 1973. At one point, they found the mastermind, a demon called Neron, and removed him from a person's body he had possessed, only for him to possess Ray instead. Neron was about to kill Nate, but Ray told him that he can have full control of his body, if he let Nate go. Neron agreed, and Ray was sent to Hell. He was sent to be tortured by Vandal Savage, but the two of them ended their rivalry. Eventually, John and Nora found him, and was returned to the real world, but in the form of a coin. When Neron broke his promise not to hurt Nate, John managed to kill Neron by managing to return Ray to his body. Ray cried over Nate's death, but the team managed to bring him back with the help of magical creatures.

Multiversal crisis 

On December 10, 2019, Ray and Sara were at a bar in Star City, when Lyla Michaels / Harbinger appeared and teleported them in National City of Earth-38. There, they joined other heroes, meeting Kate Kane / Batwoman and Mia Queen / Green Arrow. During the invasion from the Anti-Monitor's shadow demons, they fought them, but were outpowered, and the Monitor teleported them to the Waverider of Earth-74, to use as a base of operations. The Monitor informed the team that there are seven Paragons, who can stop the crisis. Ray created a Paragon detector, to find them. At some point, he met Clark Kent / Superman of Earth-96, who was his doppelgänger. His machine worked, and found that Kate is the Paragon of Courage, J'onn J'onzz / Martian Manhunter of Honor, Barry of Love and Ryan Choi of Humanity. Ray, Ralph Dibny / Elongated Man and Iris West-Allen visited Ryan, who revealed that he is a fan of Ray. The trio recruited him, and took him to the Waverider. Then, an Anti-Monitor possessed Lyla attacked them, and Nash Wells / Pariah sent he Paragons to the Vanishing Point, while Ray and the others were consumed by the anti-matter wave. After the Paragons with the help of Oliver Queen as powerful being Spectre restarted the Multiverse, Ray's memories of the old timeline were brought back by J'onn J'onzz. Then, he joined Barry, Kara and Mick to fight a giant Beebo, defeating him. Later, Ray and the rest found out that the Anti-Monitor had returned, and they created a devise to send him in the Microverse, doing so, winning him.

Leaving the Legends 

After the crisis, the Legends tried to cheer up Sara, after Oliver's death, failing in the process. They fought numerous encores, which are evil people who escaped from Hell, such as in 1917 against Rasputin, killing him; Burbank of 1947, were they defeated Benjamin Siegel, in 1989 where they stopped Freddy Meyers from becoming evil, in 1793 France, where they killed Marie Antoinette. At some point, he proposed to Nora, which she accepted and the two got married. The team found out that to stop the encores, they had to stop the Looms. They first went to 1594, to William Shakespeare, who had the first piece of the Loom. They failed, and as a result Shakespeare never aired Romeo and Juliet. The Legends aired it instead, and then Ray realised that he and Nora had to leave the team to live a peaceful life. An emotional Ray announced to the team their decision to leave the Waverider. Ray and Nora packed their things and left for 2020.

At some point he provided nanites to John Diggle / Spartan to assist Team Flash on defeating August Heart / Godspeed.

Re-assembling the former Legends 

Due to his friends, unknown to him, being arrested by the superiors of Booster Gold the timeline started to fracture. When his friend Nate Heywood / Steel was not responding to his phone calls for three weeks, he and with the help of his wife, Nora Darhk, started to recruit former Legends to fix the problem. He first went to Jefferson Jackson, and then to Carter Hall / Hawkman and Kendra Saunders / Hawkgirl. Later, they visited Mick Rory / Heat Wave, who took them to his house to discuss the issue, only for his alien children to be missing. The team agreed to help Mick and find them, with Jax becoming the new Captain Cold, as he was powerless. They eventually found that their alien grandmother took them to meet them. Nate called him and revealed that he was living in Zari Tarazi's Totem with her, and Ray felt that the Legends were not in danger, and did not continue to stop the fractures.

After 27 years, in 2049, the whole team of Legends, including former members, were enjoying a discussion between them, when suddendly they all disappeared in a green light.

Attending the CCTC 

Ray arrived in Central City to attend the Central City Technology Convention, as an honorary guest. He stayed in Barry's and Iris' apartment, and he met with Chester P. Runk, who volunteered to be his handler through the convention. Ray told Chester that his life as the Atom and Legend had passed as he decided not to start another tech business and just wanted a balanced life with his wife. During an interview with Iris, Despero attacked the event, with putting on his ATOM suit and with the assistance of Barry, defeated him. After the fight, Ray realized that there was a middle ground between his normal life and his life as the Atom, deciding to create a non-profit organization to fund young scientists named after Chester's father, leaving the city.

Helping Team Flash 

After some time, while he was working in the "Quincy P. Runk Foundation", Chester reached up to him to ask for information about the Legends of Tomorrow encounter with Eobard Thawne / Reverse Flash., with him revealing everything Nate told him about his death as a fixed point protector.

Stopping Magog 

After his vanishment, with the rest of the Legends, he is brought in Central City of 2049 to help Bart Allen / Impulse and Nora West-Allen / XS defeat Magog and his team of villains. Ray and the rest of the heroes defeated them. Afterwards, he went to the Hall of Justice, where Oliver Queen / Spectre informed the team that there was a greater threat coming.

Appearances 
Routh has appeared in five out of the seven Arrowverse TV series, and in one animated one.

 He first appeared in season 3 of Arrow, in 2014.
 Routh later appeared in The Flash, in 2015.
 He joined the main cast of Legends of Tomorrow, in 2016.
 He appeared in three episodes of the animated show Vixen, in 2016.
 He later joined other actors in the Crisis on Infinite Earths, appearing in Supergirl and Batwoman.

Reception 
Routh was cast as Atom on July 7, 2014, on the CW show of Arrow. Popular website Screen Crush wrote on a review about his performance in season 3, that the showrunners valued "concept over character", and there was an inability to connect Ray's interactions to the other characters, but when he became the ATOM, it was enjoyable to watch him. Others criticised the romance between him and Emily Bett Rickards' character, Felicity Smoak, claiming that Ray felt out of place and had no clear purpose. In season 1 of the Legends of Tomorrow, some pointed out that he resembled Marvel's Iron Man, but had his own personality, making him likeable. Many have liked Brandon Routh's portrayal of the character, and said that whenever he was on screen, the show improved. His humor and presence on the show was praised, adding "weirdness" to his character that matched the others' characters one. With the announcement of Routh's departure from the show, website ComicBook stated that it would hurt the fictional team, and the show itself.

Awards and nominations

See also 

 List of Arrowverse cast members

Notes

References

External links 
 Ray Palmer on Fandom

Arrowverse characters
DC Comics American superheroes
DC Comics characters who are shapeshifters
Fictional characters who can change size
Fictional vigilantes
Television characters introduced in 2014